A Bride for Henry is a 1937 American film directed by William Nigh based on the Josephine Bentham short story of the same name that was published in Liberty Magazine. Authors such as James Cox and Kylo-Patrick Hart have cited A Bride for Henry as within a subgenre of screwball comedies termed "sentimental comedy", where plots deal with domestic struggles but avoid true threats of adultery and ultimately defend marriage. The formation of the Production Code Administration (PCA) hastened the production of sentimental comedies; others include Maybe It's Love (1935), Three Married Men (1936), and Wife, Doctor, and Nurse (1937).

Plot
Sheila Curtis's (Anne Nagel) fiancé Eric Reynolds (Henry Mollison) fails to appear for the wedding, so Sheila drafts her lawyer, Henry Tuttle (Warren Hull), to stand in for the missing groom. When Eric finally shows up after sleeping off the bachelor party, Shelia intends to get a quick divorce and marry him after the media attention dies down.  Although Henry has been in love with her for years, he gets fed up and spends his time on their honeymoon with his old girlfriend, wealthy Helen Van Orden (Claudia Dell), and a bevy of beauties.  Shelia soon gets jealous, and realizes that Eric will always be unreliable while it's Henry she's always counted on and loved, but it might be too late. She realizes she may have taken Henry for granted.

Cast
 Anne Nagel as Sheila Curtis
 Warren Hull as Henry Tuttle
 Henry Mollison as Eric Reynolds
 Claudia Dell as Helen Van Orden
 Betty Ross Clarke as Mrs. Curtis
 Harrison Greene as Constable

Release
In September 2018, the film was available and streaming on "Moonlight Movies" channel.
The film is also currently available on several YouTube accounts.

References

External links
 
 

1937 films
American romantic drama films
1937 romantic drama films
American black-and-white films
Monogram Pictures films
Films directed by William Nigh
Films based on short fiction
1930s English-language films
1930s American films